Wutthipong Kerdkul (born March 14, 1987) is a Thai former footballer. He was also the leading scorer of the Thai Division 1 League in season 2009 with 27 goals.

References

External links
 วุฒิพงษ์ เกิดกุล. accessed October 10, 2009.

1987 births
Living people
Wutthipong Kerdkul
Wutthipong Kerdkul
Wutthipong Kerdkul
Wutthipong Kerdkul
Wutthipong Kerdkul
Wutthipong Kerdkul
Association football forwards